Hugh Francis Savile Crossley, 4th Baron Somerleyton  (born 27 September 1971), is a British restaurateur, hotel owner, landowner and conservationist. He lives at Somerleyton Hall, the  ancestral home of his family. He is a founding director of WildEast, an organisation that promotes rewilding in East Anglia and is rewilding  of his Somerleyton Hall estate.

Family life

Crossley was born 27 September 1971, the fourth child and only son of William Crossley, 3rd Baron Somerleyton (1928–2012), and his wife, Belinda Maris Loyd. He grew up at the family home of Somerleyton Hall in Lowestoft, Suffolk, and was educated at Eton College and Anglia Polytechnic University. He served as Second Page of Honour to Elizabeth II for a year at the age of 12, and succeeded to the title of Baron Somerleyton in 2012, upon on the death of his father.

His siblings include: Hon. Isabel Alicia Claire Crossley (b. 1964), Camilla Mary Lara Somerleyton (b. 1967), Alicia Phyllis Belinda Somerleyton (b. 1969), and Louisa Bridget Vivien Somerleyton (b. 1974). He is the grandson of Francis Savile Crossley, 2nd Baron Somerleyton (1889–1959), and the great-grandson of Savile Crossley, 1st Baron Somerleyton (1857–1935), a Liberal Unionist politician who served as Paymaster General from 1902 to 1905.

He married Lara Bailey in 2009 with whom he has three children: Hon. John Crossley (born February 2010), Hon. Christabel Maris Tessa Crossley (born 19 April 2012), and Hon. Margot Phyllis Mary Crossley (born June 2014)

Professional life
He developed a business within the entertainment industry, initially bringing the Eastern Haze Festival to Somerleyton Hall. 

He formerly owned two Dish Dash Persian restaurants in London operated under the company name Empty Quarter Restaurants, which were sold after his holding company went out of business in 2004. He owns the Fritton House hotel near Great Yarmouth, Norfolk. In June 2013, he opened a new restaurant in Norfolk.

He was appointed a Deputy Lieutenant of Suffolk in 2019.

He is in the process of rewilding  of the estate and is a founding trustee of WildEast, a charitable foundation that promotes regenerative farming and rewilding in the East Anglia.

References

1971 births
Living people
People educated at Eton College
Alumni of Anglia Ruskin University
British hoteliers
English businesspeople
Barons in the Peerage of the United Kingdom
Deputy Lieutenants of Suffolk